Glaeseria is a genus of Amoebozoa, including the species Glaeseria mira and Glaeseria testudinis.

Family: Body monopodial; pseudopods rare; locomotion by slight forward bulging; cysts common. 
Genus: Hyaline cap usually present in locomotion; cysts uninucleate to trinuclearte (Illustrated Guide, 1985). Pseudopods formed by forward building, with a constriction at base.

References

Amoebozoa genera